EA-4352 is an organophosphate nerve agent of the G-series. It is the isopropyl analog of tabun.

References

G-series nerve agents
Acetylcholinesterase inhibitors
Isopropyl esters